Acrocercops charitopis is a moth of the family Gracillariidae, known from Guyana. It was described by E. Meyrick in 1915.

References

charitopis
Moths of South America
Moths described in 1915